Victoria Nina "Vicky" Jenkins (born 14 April 1977) is a British Paralympic archer from Malvern, Worcestershire. She made her international debut in 2014 at the European Para-Archery Championships in Nottwil, Switzerland.

In the 2016 Summer Paralympics, her debut Paralympics, Jenkins won her first Paralympic medal which was bronze.

References

Paralympic archers of Great Britain
Archers at the 2016 Summer Paralympics
Paralympic bronze medalists for Great Britain
Living people
1977 births
British female archers
Medalists at the 2016 Summer Paralympics
Paralympic medalists in archery